Futaki is a surname. Notable people with the surname include:

 Kenzo Futaki (1873–1966), Japanese doctor
 Krisztián Futaki (born 1979), Hungarian footballer
 Kota Futaki (born 1995), Japanese baseball player
 Hajnalka Futaki (born 1990), Hungarian handball player
 Makiko Futaki (1958–2016), Japanese animator